Muhammed Ali Bedir (born 24 March 2000) is a Turkish ski jumper and national record holder.

On 27 January 2023, Bedir wrote the history, when he became the first ever Turkish ski jumper who landed over two hundred meter mark. At the Kulm ski flying hill in Tauplitz, Bad Mitterndorf, Austria he jumped 212.5 meters (697 ft) and tremendously improved previous record by Ipcioglou.

Career
In 2017/18 season he made his first World Cup entry at the Ruka and stucked at qualification round. 

In 2022 he performed at FIS Ski Flying World Championships qualifications, his first major competition.

In 2022/23 season he made his first ever World Cup main event debut at Oberstdorf (4 Hill Tournament).

Major Tournament results

FIS Nordic World Ski Championships

FIS Ski Flying World Championships

World Cup

Standings

Individual starts (6)

External links 

2000 births
Living people
Turkish male ski jumpers
Ski jumpers at the 2016 Winter Youth Olympics
21st-century Turkish people